Gypospirifer is an extinct genus of articulate brachiopod fossils belonging to the family Trigonotretidae. They were stationary epifaunal suspension feeders.

Fossils of this genus have been found in the sediments of the Carboniferous and Permian ages (314.6 to 254.0 million years ago).

Species
 Gypospirifer anancites Cooper and Grant 1976
 Gypospirifer condor d'Orbigny 1842
 Gypospirifer gryphus Cooper and Grant 1976
 Gypospirifer infraplicus King 1931
 Gypospirifer kobiyamai Tazawa and Araki 2013
 Gypospirifer nelsoni Cooper and Grant 1976
 Gypospirifer volatilis Duan and Li 1985

References

Prehistoric brachiopod genera
Pennsylvanian first appearances
Lopingian genus extinctions
Spiriferida
Paleozoic life of Nunavut